Sir John Christopher Sainty, KCB, FSA (born 1934 in London, England) is a retired British parliamentary official who was Clerk of the Parliaments from 1983 to 1990.

Family
Sir John is the son of Christopher Lawrence Sainty, of Clayton Priory, Hassocks, Sussex, and his first wife Nancy Lee Miller, of Madison, Wisconsin, and Chicago, Illinois.  He is married to Frances Sherlock and has three sons:
 Christopher Sainty, British Ambassador to Portugal since 2018
 Henry Sainty, solicitor, partner, Farrer & Co
 Edward Sainty

Sir John is also the elder half-brother of the art dealer and historian of Orders of Knighthood Guy Stair Sainty.

Education
He was educated at Winchester College, and New College, Oxford.

Career
After serving as the Private Secretary to the Leader of the House and Clerk of the Journals of the House of Lords, he was appointed Clerk of the Parliaments in 1983, retiring in 1990. He was knighted in the 1986 Queen's Birthday Honours, when he was made a Knight Commander of the Bath (KCB).  He was later appointed a Senior Fellow of the Institute of Historical Research and has published numerous articles and studies of office holders under the Crown.  He was also a Commissioner of the Historical Manuscripts Commission prior to its merger with the Public Record Office to form The National Archives.

Books
The Lord Lieutenants and their Deputies (Phillimore, 2007)
 The Judges of England 1272-1990 a list of judges of the superior courts (1993)
 A List of English Law Officers, King's Counsels and Holders of Precedence (Selden Society, 1987)
 A List of English Law Officers, King's Counsel and Holders of Patents of Precedence (Selden Society, vol.7, 1986)
 Parliamentary Functions of the Sovereign since 1509 (1980)
 Colonial Office Officials : officials of the Secretary of State for War, 1794-1801, etc. London: IHR (1976)
 Home Office officials, 1782-1870 London : Athlone Press & IHR (1975) 
 Admiralty Officials, 1660-1870 (1975)
  'The Origins of House of Lords Leadership', The Bulletin of Historical Research (BIHR) (1974)
 Officials of the Secretaries of State, 1660-1782 (1973)
 The Origin of the Office of Chairman of Committees in the House of Lords (HLRO Memorandum No.52, 1973)
 The Lord Lieutenants of counties 1585-1642 London: IHR (1970)

References

External links
Parliamentary Archives, Papers of Sir John Christopher Sainty

1934 births
Living people
Knights Companion of the Order of the Bath
Fellows of the Society of Antiquaries of London
Writers from London
People educated at Winchester College
Alumni of New College, Oxford
Clerks of the Parliaments